An oppari is an ancient form of lamenting in southern India, particularly in Tamil Nadu, Pondicherry, and North-Eastern Sri Lanka. Oppari is a folk song tradition and is often an admixture of eulogy and lament. The oppari is typically sung by a group of women relatives who came to pay respects to the departed in a death ceremony. It is a means to express one's own grief and also to share and assuage one's grief for the deceased. Many communities use the oppari to express their grief at a funeral. Sometimes professional oppari singers are recruited, but it is a dying practice.

Content and theme
The songs do not follow a set pattern; rather, the lyrics are sung impromptu, mostly improvised, and eulogise the person who has died. The oppari is also often centred around the relatives of the deceased and stresses the nature of the blood relation (mother, father, brother, sister etc.) between the person and the deceased. The oppari singer sings, wails and beats her chest and accompanied to the sounds of a beating drum she helps mourners bring their buried grief to the surface.

A sample theme of a daughter lamenting father's death is described below:

Opparis are rich in wordplay relating to names and events associated with the deceased person. Colourful local idioms also decorate the lyrics. While oppari singing is still prominent in rural Tamil Nadu, the tradition had almost died out in urban Tamil Nadu.

Representation in modern cinema 
 The Tamil film Sethum Aayiram Pon highlights this practice.
 The song Enjoy Enjaami which was sang by Arivu and Dhee highlights this practice.

References

External links

Indian folk music
Death music
Tamil music